Neidhardt is a surname of German origin. Notable people with the surname include:

Elke Neidhardt (1941–2013), German-Australian actress
Franjo Neidhardt (1907–1984), Croatian architect
Frederick C. Neidhardt (1931–2016), American microbiologist
Juraj Neidhardt (1901–1979), Yugoslav architect
Velimir Neidhardt (born 1943), Croatian architect

German-language surnames